The Philadelphia, Baltimore and Washington Railroad (PB&W) was a railroad that operated in Pennsylvania, Delaware, Maryland, and the District of Columbia in the 20th century, and was a key component of the Pennsylvania Railroad (PRR) system. Its  main line ran between Philadelphia and Washington. The PB&W main line is now part of the Northeast Corridor, owned by Amtrak.

History

The railroad was formed in 1902 when the Pennsylvania Railroad merged two of its southern subsidiaries, the Philadelphia, Wilmington and Baltimore Railroad and the Baltimore and Potomac Railroad.

In 1907, the PB&W became a co-owner of the new Washington Terminal Company, which operated the new Washington Union Station, the marble structure dubbed the "Transportation Temple of America".

In 1916, the PB&W operated  of road, including  of trackage rights.

Acquisitions
The PB&W acquired six railroad companies:
 1906: South Chester Railroad
 1913: Baltimore and Sparrow's Point Railroad, which provided freight service to Bethlehem Steel Corporation's Sparrows Point steel mill 
 1916: Philadelphia and Baltimore Central Railroad
 1916: Columbia and Port Deposit Railway
 1916: Elkton and Middletown Railroad
 1956: Pittsburgh, Cincinnati, Chicago and St. Louis Railroad (Pan Handle Route)

Improvements
In 1928, the PRR began to electrify the main line between New York City and Washington, D.C., using catenary. Electrification of the PB&W portion was completed in 1935. Amtrak still uses the 25 Hz traction power system.

Dissolution

In 1968, the Pennsylvania Railroad and its longtime rival New York Central Railroad merged to form the Penn Central Railroad. The PB&W remained a separate legal entity, although controlled and operated by the new company. The Penn Central declared bankruptcy in 1970 but continued to operate trains until 1976, when the company's railroad assets were sold under the Railroad Revitalization and Regulatory Reform Act.  Under the new law, Congress authorized the sale of the PB&W right-of-way between Philadelphia and Washington, and related assets (such as the Washington Terminal Company), to Amtrak. Other PB&W assets, including almost all of the PCC&StL (Pan Handle), were sold to the new Consolidated Rail Corporation (Conrail).

In popular culture
Flip Wilson's "Ugly Baby" (1965) routine is set on the Pennsylvania Railroad, outbound from Baltimore.

See also
 List of defunct Pennsylvania railroads 
 List of Delaware railroads 
 List of defunct Maryland railroads 
 List of Washington, D.C., railroads

References

External links

 

 
Companies affiliated with the Pennsylvania Railroad
Defunct Delaware railroads
Defunct Maryland railroads
Defunct Pennsylvania railroads
Defunct Washington, D.C., railroads
Former Class I railroads in the United States
Railway companies established in 1902
Railway companies disestablished in 1976
Standard gauge railways in the United States